Death Before Dishonor XI was the 11th Death Before Dishonor professional wrestling pay-per-view event produced by Ring of Honor (ROH). It took place on September 20, 2013, at the Pennsylvania National Guard Armory in Philadelphia, Pennsylvania.

Background
Death Before Dishonor XI will feature professional wrestling matches, which involved different wrestlers from pre-existing scripted feuds, plots, and storylines that played out on ROH's television programs. Wrestlers portrayed villains or heroes as they followed a series of events that built tension and culminated in a wrestling match or series of matches.

The ROH World Championship tournament was announced after ROH Match Maker Nigel McGuinness had to strip champion Jay Briscoe of the title due to injury. The tournament started with three first round matches (Cole vs. Mark Briscoe; A. C. H. vs. Anderson; Lethal vs. Dutt) on July 27, 2013, at ROH TV taping in Providence, RI. There was also a qualifying match at the TV taping won by Silas Young. The rest of the first round matches were on August 3 at ROH All Star Extravaganza V in Toronto, Canada, plus the first quarter-final between Cole and Lethal. The final three quarter-finals took place on August 17 at Manhattan Mayhem V in Manhattan, New York. The semi-finals and final happened at Death Before Dishonor XI.

ROH World Championship tournament

*The match ended in a draw after Whitmer was legitimately injured after a piledriver on the apron of the ring and was unable to continue. As a result, Bennett advanced in the tournament.

Results

References

External links
Ring of Honor's official website

Ring of Honor pay-per-view events
Events in Philadelphia
2013 in Pennsylvania
11
Professional wrestling in Philadelphia
September 2013 events in the United States
2013 Ring of Honor pay-per-view events